Hapoli is a locality in the town of Ziro, the headquarters of Lower Subansiri district, Arunachal Pradesh, India. The administrative offices of the district are located here. The name is said to have been derived from Hao-Polyang, by which name the Apatanis still know. Literally, "hao" means high or above and "polyang" means plain or plateau. It also serves as the commercial hub of Lower Subansiri district and boasts a large number of schools both government and private where students from all over the state come to study . The Apatanis are the native of this place and also form the majority of the population. It is divided into several zones, including the Medical colony, Engineering Colony and SSB gate.

References

Lower Subansiri district
Ziro